The deputy prime minister of Thailand is a ministerial position within the government of Thailand. Several deputy prime ministers can be appointed and serve concurrently. Such appointments are usually made by the prime minister of Thailand. This position can be combined with other ministerial portfolios. The position was first created in 1943.

Current deputy prime ministers

Note: † denotes Military officers

List of deputy prime ministers of Thailand

References

 
Thailand, Deputy Prime Ministers
Government of Thailand
Deputy Prime Minister of Thailand